The Japanese destroyer {{nihongo|Kaki|柿|}} was one of 21 s built for the Imperial Japanese Navy (IJN) in the late 1910s. She was converted to a training ship and survived the Pacific War as an auxiliary ship and was subsequently scrapped in 1948.

Design and description
The Momi class was designed with higher speed and better seakeeping than the preceding  second-class destroyers. Kaki was powered by two Parsons geared steam turbines, each driving one propeller shaft using steam provided by three Kampon water-tube boilers. Their crew consisted of 110 officers and crewmen.

The main armament of the Momi-class ships consisted of three  Type 3 guns in single mounts; one gun forward of the well deck, one between the two funnels, and the last gun atop the aft superstructure. The guns were numbered '1' to '3' from front to rear. The ships carried two above-water twin sets of  torpedo tubes; one mount was in the well deck between the forward superstructure and the bow gun and the other between the aft funnel and aft superstructure.

Construction and career
Kaki, built at the Uraga Dock Company in Uraga, Japan, was launched on October 20, 1919, and completed on August 2nd 1920. She was decommissioned on April 1, 1940, before being converted to a training ship. The ship was then re-converted to a auxiliary ship and was renamed Ōsu (大須). She served in that capacity throughout the Pacific War before being finally scrapped in 1948.

Notes

References

1919 ships
Ships built by Uraga Dock Company
Momi-class destroyers